Emily Tuttosi (born 21 September 1995) is a Canadian rugby union player. She plays as hooker for Canada internationally and for the Exeter Chiefs in the Premier 15s.

Rugby career 
Tuttosi is from Souris, Manitoba in Canada. She made her international debut for Canada against England in 2018. She joined Exeter Chiefs in 2020. She previously played for Loughborough Lightning in the 2018–19 Premier 15s season.

Tuttosi was named in the Canadian squad for the delayed 2021 Rugby World Cup in New Zealand. She scored a hat-trick against Japan in Canada's first game of the tournament. She later scored two tries against Italy in their second game.

References

1995 births
Living people
Canadian rugby union players
Sportspeople from Manitoba
Canadian female rugby union players
Canada women's international rugby union players